Cheilosia cynocephala  is a Palearctic species of hoverfly.

Description
A black Cheilosia  with a  bluish sheen, darkened wings and dark hairs.

Distribution and biology
It is found from Fennoscandia south to central France and England eastwards through Central Europe and on into central Russia.Southwards into the mountains of northern Italy and Yugoslavia. 
The habitat is open ground near rivers, streams or flushes in unimproved grassland, usually
on calcareous soils, including  montane pasture.  where it flies from July–October. The larvae mine the stems of Carduus nutans. Adults visit white umbellifers, Calluna vulgaris., Cirsium arvense, Parnassia palustris, Pulicaria, Ranunculus, Salix repens, Saxifraga azoides, Scabiosa, Senecio Sonchus...

References

External links
 Images representing Cheilosia cynocephala

Diptera of Europe
Eristalinae
Insects described in 1840
Taxa named by Hermann Loew